The 2017 Atlantic 10 men's basketball tournament is the postseason men's basketball tournament for the Atlantic 10 Conference. It was held March 8–12, 2017 at PPG Paints Arena in Pittsburgh, Pennsylvania. The championship was won by Rhode Island who defeated VCU in the championship game. As a result, Rhode Island received the conference's automatic bid to the NCAA tournament.

Seeds
All 14 A-10 schools participated in the tournament. Teams were seeded by record within the conference, with a tiebreaker system to seed teams with identical conference records. The top 10 teams received a first round bye and the top four teams received a double bye.

Schedule

Bracket

* denotes overtime period

See also
 2017 Atlantic 10 women's basketball tournament

References

Atlantic 10 men's basketball tournament
2016–17 Atlantic 10 Conference men's basketball season
Atlantic 10 Men's B